The Electronic Industries Alliance (EIA; until 1997 Electronic Industries Association) was an American standards and trade organization composed as an alliance of trade associations for electronics manufacturers in the United States. They developed standards to ensure the equipment of different manufacturers was compatible and interchangeable. The EIA ceased operations on February 11, 2011, but the former sectors continue to serve the constituencies of EIA.

History 

In 1924, 50 radio manufacturers in Chicago formed a trade group called the Associated Radio Manufacturers.  This organization was designed to control the licensing of the large number of radio patents so that each member could have access to all the relevant patents necessary to build radio transmitters, antennas and receivers.  Over time, new electronic technologies brought new members,  non-manufacturer members, and name changes.

Names in chronological order:
 1924 – Associated Radio Manufacturers
 1924 – Radio Manufacturers Association (RMA) 
 1950 – Radio Television Manufacturers Association (RTMA)
 1953 – Radio Electronics Television Manufacturers Association (RETMA)
 1957 – Electronic Industries Association (EIA)
 1997 – Electronic Industries Alliance (EIA)

The organization's headquarters were in Arlington, Virginia. The EIA divided its activities into the following sectors:
 ECA – Electronic Components, Assemblies, Equipment & Supplies Association
 JEDEC – JEDEC Solid State Technology Association, former Joint Electron Device Engineering Council
 GEIA – (now part of TechAmerica), Government Electronics and Information Technology Association
 TIA – Telecommunications Industry Association
 CEA – Consumer Electronics Association

The EIA announced in 2007 that it would be dissolved into its constituent divisions, and transferred operations soon after. The Alliance formally ceased to exist on February 11, 2011. EIA designated ECA to continue to develop standards for interconnect, passive and electro-mechanical (IP&E) electronic components under the ANSI-designation of EIA standards. All other electronic components standards will be managed by their respective sectors.

The ECA merged with the National Electronic Distributors Association (NEDA) in 2011 to form the Electronic Components Industry Association (ECIA). However, the EIA standards brand will continue for IP&E standards within ECIA.

EIA standards 

 
With the changing names of the EIA, the naming convention of the standards was also adapted. For example, a standard defining serial communication between computers and modems e.g. was originally drafted as a Recommended Standard, thus the "RS" RS-232. Later it was taken over by the EIA as EIA-232. Later this standard was managed by the TIA and the name was changed to the current TIA-232. Because the EIA was accredited by ANSI to help develop standards in its areas, these standards are often described as (e.g. ANSI TIA-232, or formerly as ANSI EIA/TIA-232). As currently authorized, any ANSI standard designated at ANSI EIA-xxx is developed or managed by ECA (and, in the future, ECIA).

See also
 Electronic color code – RMA Resistor Color Code
 E series of preferred numbers – RMA Preferred Number Values of Fixed Composition Resistors

References

External links
 The JEDEC history page, including EIA history

1924 establishments in Illinois
2011 disestablishments in the United States
Organizations established in 1924
Organizations disestablished in 2011
2011 mergers and acquisitions
Companies based in San Francisco
Electrical safety standards organizations
Standards organizations in the United States
Technology trade associations